Sporomusa is a genus of Bacillota bacteria classified within the class Negativicutes.

Further examination of members of this clade suggest that this group are actually members of the Clostridia.

Phylogeny
The currently accepted taxonomy is based on the List of Prokaryotic names with Standing in Nomenclature (LPSN) and National Center for Biotechnology Information (NCBI)

See also
 List of bacterial orders
 List of bacteria genera

References 

Negativicutes
Gram-negative bacteria
Bacteria genera